Russell House, also known as Pate Funeral Home, is a historic home located at Bedford in Bedford County, Pennsylvania. It was built in 1815–1816, and is a -story, 5-bay by 3-bay, brick dwelling in the late-Georgian style.  A two-story rear ell was added about 1840–1845.  The tin-covered gable roof has three gable roof frame dormers.

Solomon Filler was hired to design and build the house.

The Russell House was purchased in May 2017 by the Bedford County Chamber of Commerce, with plans to create a Business & Education Center to serve the Bedford County region.  When renovated, the building is expected to house as many as 24 budding businesses in accelerator and shared-workspace opportunities. Additional features will include: community art exhibits, historical displays, community meeting space, a heritage garden, and a veranda adjacent to Veterans Grove.

It was listed on the National Register of Historic Places in 1979.

References 

Houses on the National Register of Historic Places in Pennsylvania
Houses completed in 1816
Houses in Bedford County, Pennsylvania
1816 establishments in Pennsylvania
History of Bedford County, Pennsylvania
National Register of Historic Places in Bedford County, Pennsylvania